The MEO Rip Curl Pro Portugal 2016 was an event of the World Surf League for 2016 World Surf League Men's Championship Tour.

This event was held from 18 to 29 October in the Supertubos beach at Peniche, (Leiria, Portugal), with 36 surfers competing. Due to the lack of conditions, the organization explored some good surfing spots in the peninsula to end the event in the correct date and some stages of the event were also held at Point Fabril beach between Almagreira and Pico da Mota in Ferrel(pt). Soon as the good waves came back to Supertubos the organization switched again of place.

The tournament was won by John John Florence, who beat the rookie Conner Coffin in the final.

Quarter-finals

Semi-finals

Final

References

Rip Curl Pro Portugal
2016 World Surf League
2016 in Portuguese sport
October 2016 sports events in Portugal
Sport in Leiria District